Shamkhal Sultan, also known as Shamkhal Sultan Cherkes, was an important Circassian noble of the second half of the 16th century in the Safavid Empire.

Biography

Family
Shamkhal Sultan, alongside his sister Sultan-Agha Khanum, were from a prominent Circassian family from within the Safavid Empire. Sultan-Agha Khanum was married to king Tahmasp I, having one daughter known as Pari Khan Khanum, and a son known as Suleiman Mirza.

Career
Shamkhal Sultan appears prominently on the political scene during the same time as his niece, Pari Khan Khanum, who was born by his sister Sultan-Agha Khanum and king Tahmasp I. He participated actively in Pari Khan Khanum's political designs and acted for a time as her spokesman, and during their presence, the Safavid political sphere was dominated by ethnic Circassians, amongst the other factions that joined Shamkhal Sultan and his cousin. He was executed shortly afterward his niece's own assassination in 1578.

References

Sources

 
 
 
 
 
 
 

1588 deaths
Iranian people of Circassian descent
Circassian nobility
16th-century people of Safavid Iran
Safavid governors of Shaki